Anders Leonard Zorn (18 February 1860 – 22 August 1920) was a Swedish painter. He attained international success as a painter, sculptor, and etching artist. Among Zorn's portrait subjects include King Oscar II of Sweden and three American Presidents: Grover Cleveland, William H. Taft, and Theodore Roosevelt. At the end of his life, he established the Swedish literary Bellman Prize in 1920.

Biography
Zorn was born and raised on his grandparents' farm in Yvraden, a hamlet near the village of Utmeland in the parish of Mora, Dalarna. He studied until the age of twelve in the school at Mora Strand before progressing in the autumn of 1872 to a secondary grammar school in Enköping.

From 1875 to 1880, Zorn studied at the Royal Swedish Academy of Arts in Stockholm, where he amazed his teachers with his talent. Members of the Stockholm Society approached him with commissions. In early 1881, Zorn met Emma Lamm, whose background was quite different from his. Emma Lamm was from a wealthy Jewish merchant family. She was interested in art and culture and, after a long engagement, they were married in a civil ceremony in October 1885.

Zorn traveled extensively, to London, Paris, the Balkans, Spain, Italy and the United States; he became an international success and one of the most highly regarded painters of his era. It was primarily his skill as a portrait painter that gained Zorn international acclaim, based principally upon his incisive ability to depict the individual character of his model. His subjects included three American Presidents: Grover Cleveland, William H. Taft and Theodore Roosevelt.

Honors
At the age of 29, he was made a Chevalier de la Légion d'honneur at the Exposition Universelle 1889 Paris World Fair.

Collection
Zorn's art made him wealthy and he was thus able to build up a considerable collection of art. The objects were not only bought in his native country but also during the many travels he made abroad. In their joint will, Anders and Emma Zorn donated their entire holdings to the Swedish State.

Some of his most important works can be seen at the National Museum of Fine Arts (Swedish: Nationalmuseum) in Stockholm. Among them is Midsummer Dance (1897), a depiction of dancers in the evening light of a rural Midsummer's Eve celebration. Other museums holding major works by Zorn include the Musée d'Orsay in Paris, the Metropolitan Museum of Art in New York, and the Museum of Fine Arts, Boston. The Zorn Collections (Swedish:Zornsamlingarna) located in Mora and Garberg, Älvdalen, consist of four museums dedicated to the life and works of Anders Zorn. The main museum – Zornmuseet – was designed by Ragnar Östberg and opened in 1939. Shown there are extensive works of Zorn and his collected art by Rembrandt Harmensz van Rijn, 'The Hovingham Master' (Poussin's follower), Bruno Liljefors, Albert Edelfelt, and Pehr Hilleström.

The Bellman Prize (Bellmanpriset) is a literature prize for "an outstanding Swedish poet", every year awarded by the Swedish Academy. The prize was established by Anders Zorn and his wife Emma in 1920.

Zorngården
In 1886, Anders Zorn and his wife, Emma, bought land close to Mora church and here they moved to a cottage from his maternal grandfather's farm. When Anders and Emma Zorn decided to return to Sweden after several years abroad, they began to enlarge the cottage. Zorngården, the Zorn combined smallholding, farmstead, and residence, was completed in 1910.

Zorngården remains today much as it was at the time of Emma Zorn's death in 1942. It is a fine example of an artist's home from the early years of the 20th century. With inspiration from English and Swedish architecture, it is today an excellent example of the architectural freedom that characterizes the years around 1900.

The main part of Zorngården consists of Zorn's home and a museum with his art, but there are two other museums that also are part of the Zorn Collections. Gammelgården is in the southern part of Mora and consists of some 40 timber houses that Zorn bought to make sure that the old art of building such houses would not be forgotten. Gopsmor, Zorn's refuge when under stress, is in the municipality of Älvdalen and is only open for visitors in July.

Paintings
While his early works were often brilliant, luminous watercolors, by 1887 he had switched firmly to oils. Zorn was a prolific artist. He became an international success as one of the most acclaimed portrait painters of his era. His sitters included three American Presidents, nobility, the Swedish king and queen and numerous members of high society. Zorn also painted portraits of family members, friends, and self-portraits. Zorn is also noted for his nude paintings. His fondness of painting full-figured women gave rise to the terms Zornkulla or dalkulla, an unmarried woman or girl from Dalarna, as the women were called in the local dialect of the region where Zorn lived.

The paintings have the freedom and energy of sketches, using warm and cool light and shade areas with contrasting areas of warm and cool tones, and an understanding of color contrasts and reflected lights. Zorn's accomplished use of the brush allows the forms and the texture of the painted subject to reflect and transmit light. In addition to portraits and nudes, Zorn excelled in realistic depictions of water, as well as scenes depicting rustic life and customs.

Zorn's palette 
Zorn was known to use a basic color palette consisting of Lead White (Flake White), Yellow Ochre, Vermilion and Ivory Black. This limited color palette shows tremendous range in terms of color mixing. A large variety of tonal ranges is possible using this palette, a very important development for portrait painting. The color palette can also be used in still life and landscape painting under certain circumstances. The most striking aspect is that an olive greenish color is possible to obtain by mixing Ivory Black with Yellow Ochre, as Ivory Black is bluish in nature.

Other major works

Martha Dana (later Mrs. William Mercer) (1899) Museum of Fine Arts, Boston
George Peabody Gardner (1899) Museum of Fine Arts, Boston 
 A Portrait of the Daughters of Ramón Subercaseaux (1892), Private collection
Traveling companion (Mr. Charles Deering) (1904) Museum of Fine Arts, Boston

Works

See also
Bruno Liljefors
Zorn Collections

References

Other sources
Birnbaum, Britta (1985). Paintings at Nationalmuseum. (Stockholm: Nationalmuseum) 
Lidbeck, Sven (2007). Anders Zorn Etchings – Catalogue Raisonné 2007. (Stockholm: Zorn Gallery) 
"Anders Zorn in the Gilded Age", PBS biography (Colorado Public Television), one hour, 2013.
 Oliver Tostmann, ed., Anders Zorn: A European Artist Seduces America (Boston: The Isabella Stewart Gardner Museum, 2013)
 ArtGraphica biography

Further reading
Asplund, Karl. Anders Zorn: His Life And Work  (edited By Geoffrey Holme The Studio, Ltd. 1921)
Facos, Michelle, Swedish Impressionism and Its Boston Champion:  Anders Zorn and Mrs. Gardner (Boston: The Isabella Stewart Gardner Museum, 1993)
Facos, Michelle, “Anders Zorn and English Art,” The Nationalmuseum Bulletin (Spring 1994) vol. 18, no. 1: 58–67
Laurvik, John Nilsen  Anders Zorn (F. Keppel. 1913)
Engstrom, Albert  Anders Zorn  (Stockholm: Albert Bonniers Forlag. 1928) Swedish
Boethius, Gerda  Anders Zorn;: An international Swedish artist, his life and work (Stockholm: Nordisk Rotogravyr, 1962) Swedish
Hagans, William and Willow  Zorn In America: A Swedish Impressionist of the Gilded Age (Swedish American Historical Society, 2009) English

External links 

Zorn Collections
Zorn Gallery in Stockholm

Listing of 289 Zorn prints with reference numbers and many with images at Artists Archive
Zorngården house
Anders Zorn exhibition catalogs
Anders Zorn: Sweden's Master Painter at National Academy of Design, 2014 
Anders Zorn in the Gilded Age video trailer

1860 births
1920 deaths
19th-century Swedish painters
20th-century Swedish painters
20th-century male artists
20th-century printmakers
Chevaliers of the Légion d'honneur
Orientalist painters
Portrait painters
People from Mora Municipality
Swedish Impressionist painters
St Ives artists
Swedish printmakers
Swedish male painters
19th-century male artists